"The Tale of Melibee" (also called "The Tale of Melibeus") is one of The Canterbury Tales by Geoffrey Chaucer.

This is the second tale in the collection told by Chaucer himself. After being interrupted by the host Harry Bailly, Chaucer launches into one of the longest and some would say most boring of all the tales. While some scholars have treated the tale as a joke, it is a faithful rendering of the Liber consolationis et consilii by Albertanus of Brescia and is no less serious than the articles of faith laid out later in "The Parson's Tale".

Chaucer seemingly tells this story in revenge, as his first story, Sir Thopas, was interrupted and compared to a turd. In response, Chaucer tells The Tale of Melibee, which is exactly that. Bailly, seemingly pleased with this tale, says he wishes his wife had heard it as she might learn something from Dame Prudence. 

The tale is a translation of the Livre de Melibée et de Dame Prudence by Renaud de Louens. Renaud's work itself is a very loose translation of Liber consolationis et consilii by Albertanus of Brescia, suggesting the tale's popularity. The tale's length has resulted in its omission in some modern English editions, such as Nevill Coghill's translation.

Plot 
The story concerns Melibee who is away one day when three enemies break into his house, beat his wife Dame Prudence, and attack his daughter, leaving her for dead. The tale then proceeds as a long debate mainly between Melibee and his wife on what actions to take and how to seek redress from his enemies. His wife, as her name suggests, counsels prudence and chides him for his rash opinions. The discussion uses many proverbs and quotes from learned authorities and the Bible as each make their points. Dame Prudence's discussion of marriage mirrors those of the Wife of Bath and the wife in "The Shipman's Tale".

References

External links

"The Tale of Melibee", middle-english hypertext with glossary and side-by-side middle english and modern english
"Chaucer's own tale of Prudence and Melibee" – a plain-English retelling for non-scholars.

Melibee, The Tale of